Abdul Awal Bhuiya was a Member of the 4th National Assembly of Pakistan as a representative of East Pakistan.

Career
Bhuiya was a Member of the  4th National Assembly of Pakistan. He was the Pakistan Parliamentary secretary for foreign affairs.

References

Pakistani MNAs 1965–1969
Living people
Year of birth missing (living people)
People from Comilla District